Santa Catarina Quiané is a town and municipality in Oaxaca in south-western Mexico. The municipality covers an area of  km². 
It is part of the Zimatlán District in the west of the Valles Centrales Region

References

Municipalities of Oaxaca